Shericka Williams (born 17 September 1985 in Black River, St. Elizabeth) is a Jamaican former sprinter. Together with Novlene Williams, Ronetta Smith and Lorraine Fenton she won a silver medal in 4 x 400 metres relay at the 2005 World Championships in Athletics. She also competed in the individual contest, but was knocked out in the semifinal. Two years later, she won another silver medal in the 4 x 400 metres relay event at the 2007 World Championships in Athletics, this time with Shereefa Lloyd, Davita Prendagast and Novlene Williams. The team set a national record in that race, finishing second to the United States in  a time of 3:19.73.

At the 2008 Summer Olympics in Beijing, China, Williams won the silver medal in the 400 metres in a personal-best time of 49.39 seconds. She also won bronze in the 4 × 400 m relay with Shereefa Lloyd, Rosemarie Whyte and Novlene Williams.

At the 2012 Summer Olympics, she only competed in the 4 × 400 m relay, winning a silver medal with the Jamaican team of Christine Day, Rosemarie Whyte and Novlene Williams.  She was also part of the Jamaican 4 × 400 m team that won gold at the 2014 Commonwealth Games with a Commonwealth Games record.

Personal bests
 200 metres – 22.50 (2008)
 400 metres – 49.32 (2009)

References

External links

 
IAAF "Focus on Athletes" article

1985 births
Living people
Jamaican female sprinters
People from Saint Elizabeth Parish
Olympic athletes of Jamaica
Athletes (track and field) at the 2008 Summer Olympics
Athletes (track and field) at the 2012 Summer Olympics
Olympic silver medalists for Jamaica
Commonwealth Games medallists in athletics
World Athletics Championships medalists
Medalists at the 2012 Summer Olympics
Medalists at the 2008 Summer Olympics
Athletes (track and field) at the 2006 Commonwealth Games
Athletes (track and field) at the 2014 Commonwealth Games
Commonwealth Games gold medallists for Jamaica
Olympic silver medalists in athletics (track and field)
IAAF Continental Cup winners
Olympic female sprinters
21st-century Jamaican women
Medallists at the 2014 Commonwealth Games